The 30th National Convention of the Communist Party USA was held from 13 to 15 June 2014 in Chicago, Illinois. The Party set its agenda taking into account developments since its May 2010 convention, including the April 2014 convention of the AFL–CIO, the 2012 election, and the Occupy movement, as well as re-examining the Party's organizational structure.

Pre-convention
The National Committee of the Communist Party USA met on 16–17 November 2013 in New York City to assess the political development, project actions and adopt plans for the 30th National Convention and the discussion period preceding it. Chairman Sam Webb opened the meeting with an assessment of the recent government shutdown and its aftermath, the implementation of the Patient Protection and Affordable Care Act, the 2013 election results, new developments in organized labor, the Democratic Party and neo-liberalism, climate change, and the struggle against racism. While no resolutions were made, subjects of discussion included incorporating "Socialism of the 21st Century" into the party platform, as well as changes to terminology, including officially dropping Marxism–Leninism from the party constitution.

The Chicago convention was to have 3 days of official Communist Party USA activities; increased online activity was expected. The Communist Party USA had to deal with issues of supporting the Molotov–Ribbentrop Pact, for example, which hurt the party's credibility. A bus tour was taken at the Haymarket statue, where a deadly labor strike had occurred in 1886. About 300 turned out to celebrate the party's 95th anniversary.

References

Communist Party USA
National Convention of the Communist Party USA
2014
2014 conferences
June 2014 events in the United States